Lophocampa lesieuri is a moth of the family Erebidae. It was described by Benoît Vincent 2005. It is found in the Dominican Republic.

References

 Natural History Museum Lepidoptera generic names catalog
Lophocampa lesieuri at BOLD Systems

lesieuri
Moths described in 2005